Con Colleano (born Cornelius Sullivan; 26 December 1899 – 13 November 1973) was an Australian tightrope walker. He was the first person to successfully attempt a forward somersault on a tightrope and became one of the most celebrated and highly paid circus performers of his time. He was known as "The Wizard of the Wire" or "The Toreador of the Wire".

Early life

He was born Cornelius Sullivan in Lismore, New South Wales on 26 December 1899, the son of Cornelius Sullivan (1874-1952), and Julia Vittorine Sullivan (1878-1953), née Robinson, a woman of partial Bundjalung descent, whose father was an Afro-Caribbean man from St Thomas in the Danish West Indies. Colleano was the third of 10 children. His father (reportedly a freed convict) made a precarious living from sideshow "take-on-all-comers" boxing and gambling.

Around 1907, when Colleano was seven years old, the family settled in Lightning Ridge, New South Wales, then a newly established opal mining field and a fertile ground for the father's talents. Here Colleano received a rudimentary education and learned circus skills from the sideshows present in the town.

Career

By 1910, those of the family of sufficient age had formed a small circus troupe, calling themselves the "Collinos" (apparently as an Italian-sounding name befitting the "sable" complexion of the children, in order to cover the "native blood" in their veins). They traveled through New South Wales and supplemented their income by working for the major traveling circuses of the time.

By 1918, now known as "Colleano's All-Star Circus"  (with more of Con's siblings), the troupe was sufficiently established to travel through Queensland on their own hired train. The children became known as "The Royal Hawaiian Troupe" (again to cover for their dark complexions).

In 1919, Con managed to achieve the foot-to-foot forward somersault he had been attempting for some time and which was destined to secure his subsequent career. In 1922 he was engaged by the popular Tivoli circuit, the major outlet for vaudeville in Australia, on a salary of  £60 a week. His siblings also appeared at The Tiv as "Eight Akbar Arabs".

Fame
Having learnt dance moves from his fiancée, soubrette Winifred Constance Stanley "Winnie" Trevail (1900-1986), which he translated to the wire, Con was ready to move overseas to further his career.

At his first performances in South Africa he was billed as Australian, but in April 1924 he adopted the Spanish toreador persona he was to employ for the greatest part of his subsequent career. In September 1924 he appeared at the New York Hippodrome Theatre and was soon noticed and engaged by Ringling Bros. and Barnum & Bailey Circus, the largest in the country. His act now involved well-executed bullfighting movements in the ring, Spanish dance moves on the wire, and in conclusion, the dangerous forward somersault.

Thenceforth, through the 1930s until the outbreak of World War II in 1939, Con was the principal star of Ringling Bros. with a salary of US$1000 per week. At this time the Big Tent could seat up to 16,000 people. In the winter he performed on the vaudeville circuit in Europe to great acclaim, among his greatest admirers being Adolf Hitler.

In 1937, he returned to Sydney, Australia for a series of performances at the Tivoli ("the Tiv"). Into the 1940s Colleano continued performing in the U.S. and appeared on television on the Texaco Star Theater in 1952. His farm in Pennsylvania became a retreat for his siblings and their offspring between performances and, so established, he adopted United States citizenship together with now wife Winnie in 1950.

Personal life
In 1956 Con and Winnie returned to Australia where they purchased the Albion Hotel at Forbes, New South Wales. When the venture failed, they returned to America and he resumed his career on the wire to no great acclaim, ending at Honolulu in 1960.

Con and Winnie had no children; Con was the uncle of American actor Bonar Colleano and the great-uncle of American actor Jack Stehlin.

Death
He died at his home in Miami in 1973 survived by Winnie who later returned to Australia. Winifred died in 1986 in Sydney.

Ethnicity
Colleano's father was white; his mother the daughter of a West Indian father and part-Aboriginal mother. From Federation Australia aspired to a white society, legislated by the White Australian Policy (1901) concerning immigration, and the Commonwealth Franchise Act 1902, under which "Indigenous people from Australia, Asia, Africa and the Pacific Islands, with the exception of Māori"  were denied voting rights. While unskilled labour was almost the sole employment option for those of mixed race, the circus provided an opportunity.

In South Africa, Colleano first used his Spanish toreador act; to identify as an Australian or being of African descent would likely have proven unhelpful at the box office. Thenceforth, he retained his assumed racial identity being generally perceived as Spanish. Despite the tenor of Skipping on Stars and other recent reportage, no evidence suggests that, within the non-discriminatory milieu of the circus, he denied, or was greatly concerned by, his heritage.

Honours
In 1997 he, (together with May Wirth), was honoured by Australia Post on a postage stamp depicting a contemporary poster entitled The Wizard of the Wire.

Legacy
Jack Wilson and Joe Keppel met in Colleano's Circus after the First World War; they later formed the act Wilson, Keppel and Betty.

Con Colleano was inducted into the International Circus Hall of Fame in 1966 and Winifred Colleano in 1975.

Colleano's name was included in the Circus Hall of Fame, Sarasota, Florida, in 1966.

He was celebrated in The Flying Fruit Fly Circus show Skipping on Stars (2004), which was a tribute to his life.

Artist Karla Dickens celebrated his life and that of Indigenous Australian boxers in her multimedia installation, A Dickensian Circus, which went on display at several art galleries in 2020.

References

Further reading
 Mark St Leon, The Wizard of the Wire : the Story of Con Colleano,  Canberra : Aboriginal Studies Press, 1993

External links
Ninensm article on Flying Fruit Fly Circus production on Colleano Skipping on Stars
Australian Dictionary of Biography
Related holdings within the National Library of Australia including programs, photographs and oral history interviews
Photo Bucket – Colleano on wire

1899 births
1973 deaths
Australian circus performers
Australian people of Indigenous Australian descent
Australian people of Irish descent
Australian people of Cruzan descent
People from Lismore, New South Wales
Tightrope walkers
Gamilaraay